The Bristol Type 192 Belvedere is a British twin-engine, tandem rotor military helicopter built by the Bristol Aeroplane Company. It was designed by Raoul Hafner for a variety of transport roles including troop transport, supply dropping and casualty evacuation. It was operated by the Royal Air Force (RAF) from 1961 to 1969. The Belvedere was Britain's only tandem rotor helicopter to enter production, and one of the few not built by Piasecki or Boeing.

Design and development

The Belvedere was based on the Bristol Type 173 10-seat (later 16-seat) civilian helicopter which first flew on 3 January 1952. The 173 project was cancelled in 1956, and Bristol spent time on the Type 191 and Type 193 to Royal Navy and Royal Canadian Navy specifications. These two naval variants were cancelled, but the RAF expressed an interest in the aircraft and the Type 192 "Belvedere" was created. Three Type 191 airframes were almost complete when the order was cancelled, but they were used to aid the development of the Type 192. The first two were used as test rigs for the new Napier Gazelle engines and the third was used for fatigue tests.

The Type 192 shared some of its design features with the cancelled naval variants, which made it less than ideal for transporting troops. The front undercarriage was unusually tall, originally designed to give adequate clearance for loading torpedoes underneath the fuselage in the anti-submarine warfare role. The engines were placed at either end of the cabin. (By comparison the contemporary purpose-designed troop transport Boeing Vertol CH-46 Sea Knight had its engines above the aft cabin to permit a rear loading ramp). To provide access to the cabin from the cockpit there was a small entry past the engine that resulted in a bulge on the left side of the fuselage.

The first Type 192 prototype XG447 flew on 5 July 1958 with tandem wooden rotor blades, a completely manual control system and a castored, fixed quadricycle undercarriage. From the fifth prototype, the rotors fitted were all-metal, four-bladed units. Production model controls and instruments allowed night operations. The prototype machines had an upwards-hinged main passenger and cockpit door, which was prone to being slammed shut by the downwash from the rotors. This was replaced by a sliding door on the later aircraft.

Twenty-six Belvederes were built, entering service as the Belvedere HC Mark 1. They were originally designed for use with the Royal Navy but were later adapted to carry 18 fully equipped troops with a total load capacity of 6,000 lb (2,700 kg). The two rotors were synchronised through a shaft to prevent blade collision, allowing the aircraft to operate through only one engine in the event of an emergency. In that case, the remaining engine would automatically run up to double power to compensate.

Bristol attempted to market a civilian variant of the helicopter, designated the Type 192C. The 192C would have had seats for 24 passengers and was aimed at intercity services. To demonstrate the aircraft's potential, Bristol chief test pilot Charles "Sox" Hosegood set the London–Paris and Paris–London speed records in May 1961 in a Belvedere. However, no orders were placed for the 192C.

Operational history

Three pre-production Belvederes (XG453, 454, 456) went to the Belvedere Trials Unit at RAF Odiham, which was subsequently reformed as No. 66 Squadron RAF in 1961. Engine starter problems caused trouble at first, but operational deployment continued. The production aircraft  saw service in Europe, Africa, Southern Arabia and Borneo. Meanwhile, the original prototype XG447 was broken up at Porton Down on 7 August 1966.

In 1962 a 72 Squadron Belvedere lowered the 80 ft tall spire onto the new Coventry Cathedral.

As well as 66 Squadron, the type was deployed to 72 Squadron in 1961 and 26 Squadron in 1962, all at Odiham. 26 Squadron later transferred to RAF Khormaksar where it disbanded in November 1965. The helicopters were transferred by HMS Albion to Singapore to join 66 Squadron until that squadron was disbanded in 1969. 72 Squadron kept its Belvederes until August 1964 when it exchanged them for Westland Wessex.

The RAF Belvederes were involved in combat in the Aden Emergency and in Borneo (during the Indonesia–Malaysia confrontation).

Variants

Type 173
Civil transport prototype
Type 191 Projected naval version. Never flown; first two aircraft used as Gazelle ground test rigs for Type 192.
Type 192 Military transport helicopter for the Royal Air Force, under designation Belvedere HC Mk 1.
Type 192C Proposed civil version with 24 seats, not built.
Type 193Variant for the Royal Canadian Navy based on the Type 191, not built.
Type 194Proposed civil version of Type 192 with Gnome engines.

Operators

Royal Air Force
No. 26 Squadron RAF
No. 66 Squadron RAF
No. 72 Squadron RAF

Surviving aircraft

The following Bristol Belvederes have been preserved and are either on display or undergoing restoration.

Belvedere HC.1
XG452 undergoing restoration at The Helicopter Museum, Weston-Super-Mare 
XG454 on display at The Helicopter Museum, Weston-super-Mare from January 2022
XG474 on display at Royal Air Force Museum, Hendon
XG462 (nose section only) at The Helicopter Museum, Weston-Super-Mare

Specifications (Belvedere HC.1)

See also

References

Citations

Bibliography
Barnes, C.H., Bristol Aircraft since 1910.London: Putnam Publishing, 1970. 
Jefford, C.G., RAF Squadrons. Shrewsbury: Airlife Publishing, 2nd edition, 2001. 
 Lambert, Mark. "In The Air: No 155 : Westland Belvedere". Flight International, 8 February 1962, pp. 211–214.
 Taylor, John W. R. Jane's All The World's Aircraft 1961–62. London: Sampson Low, Marston & Company, 1961.

External links

 Bristol Belvedere helis.com helicopter database
 Video of helicopter operations in the Far East, including shots of a flypast of 11 Belvederes

1960s British military transport aircraft
Aircraft first flown in 1958
Belvedere
Military transport helicopters
Tandem rotor helicopters
1960s British helicopters